Katsuzō Toyota (27 December 1882 – 23 November 1939) was Director of the Karafuto Agency (5 August 1926 – 27 July 1927). He was also mayor of Hagi, Yamaguchi and Governor of Fukui Prefecture (1924–1926). He was a graduate of the University of Tokyo. He was a member of the Government-General of Taiwan.

1882 births
1939 deaths
Members of the Government-General of Taiwan
Hagi, Yamaguchi
Mayors of places in Japan
Politicians from Yamaguchi Prefecture
Governors of Fukui Prefecture
Directors of the Karafuto Agency
University of Tokyo alumni
People from Yamaguchi Prefecture
Japanese Home Ministry government officials
Japanese Police Bureau government officials